Millersylvania State Park is a public recreation area located on Deep Lake  south of Olympia, Washington. In 2009, the park was listed on the National Register of Historic Places in recognition of its well-preserved Civilian Conservation Corps landscape. It is managed by the Washington State Parks and Recreation Commission.

History 
The area was homesteaded by Squire Lathum in 1855 and then was sold to John Miller. The Miller family called the area Miller's Glade, before changing it Millersylvania and giving the property to the state in 1921 for perpetual use as a park. Remnants of a narrow-gauge railway, 19th-century skid roads, and other reminders of the logging industry can be found on park grounds, including tree stumps bearing the scars of springboards used by loggers. In 1935, the Civilian Conservation Corps became active in the park constructing buildings, trails, roads, picnic shelters, bathhouses and a caretaker's home, most of which remain intact and in use.

Activities and amenities
The park offers camping,  of hiking and biking trails, boating, fishing and swimming. Millersylvania was once reportedly home to a rare species of freshwater crab, as reported in the Miller family diaries, which became extinct due to overfishing by new settlers coming from the east.

References

External links

Millersylvania State Park Washington State Parks and Recreation Commission 
Millersylvania State Park Map Washington State Parks and Recreation Commission

State parks of Washington (state)
National Register of Historic Places in Olympia, Washington
Civilian Conservation Corps in Washington (state)
Parks in Thurston County, Washington
Protected areas established in 1921